Šerbedžija is a surname. Notable people with the surname include: 

Danilo Šerbedžija (born 1971), Croatian film director
Lucija Šerbedžija (born 1973), Croatian actress and model
Rade Šerbedžija (born 1946), Serbian and Croatian actor, director and musician

Serbian surnames